108 Demon Kings (French: 108 Rois-Démons) is a 2014 computer-animated family adventure film directed by Pascal Morelli. The film premiered at the Forum des Images on 4 December 2014 before it was released theatrically wide in France on 21 January 2015 in France.

Voice cast
Lucien Jean-Baptiste as Tourbillon-Noir
Bertrand Nadler as Tête-de-Léopard
 as L'Empereur
 as Face-Blanche
Daniela Labbé Cabrera as Vipère-Jaune
 as Zhang
Lucille Boudonnat as Duan (petit)
Hélène Bizot as Duan (grand)
Hanako Danjo as Pei Pei
Xavier Aubert as Cai Jing
Mark Antoine as Maréchal Gao
 as Doyen des mandarins
 as Mort-Prématurée
 as Trépas-Instantané
 as Barbe-Pourpre

Reception
The film had 30,005 admissions at the French box office.

References

External links

2014 computer-animated films
2010s adventure films
2010s French animated films
2010s French-language films
Animated adventure films
Belgian animated films
Films set in the 12th century
Films set in China
French adventure films
Luxembourgian animated films
Films scored by Rolfe Kent
French-language Belgian films
French-language Luxembourgian films